Miller v. Johnson, 515 U.S. 900 (1995), was a United States Supreme Court case concerning "affirmative gerrymandering/racial gerrymandering", where racial minority-majority electoral districts are created during redistricting to increase minority Congressional representation.

Background
Only one of Georgia's ten congressional districts was primarily African American between 1980 and 1990. According to the 1990 Census, Georgia's increase in population entitled the state to an eleventh congressional seat. That  prompted Georgia's General Assembly to re-draw the state's congressional districts. After the Justice Department denied several of the Assembly's proposed new districts, as the state's population was 27% African-American, but formed a majority in only one of the now 11 districts, the Assembly drew the 11th district to create a second majority-black district. The case was brought to court by white voters in the Eleventh Congressional District of the state of Georgia.

Question before the Supreme Court
Is racial gerrymandering of the congressional redistricting process a violation of the Equal Protection Clause?

Decision of the Court
Justice Kennedy wrote the majority opinion for the Court. Ruling against the district, the Court declared the district unconstitutional under the Equal Protection Clause of the Fourteenth Amendment, according to the interpretation in Shaw v. Reno (1993).  The court noted that in some instances, "a reapportionment plan may be so highly irregular and bizarre in shape that it rationally cannot be understood as anything other than an effort to segregate voters based on race." Citing Shaw v. Reno, the majority concluded that strict scrutiny is required whenever race is the "overriding, predominant force" in the redistricting process. Justice Sandra Day O'Connor wrote a concurrence, while Justice Ruth Bader Ginsburg wrote a dissent joined by Justices John Paul Stevens, Stephen G. Breyer, and David H. Souter. Stevens wrote an additional, separate dissent joined by no other justice.

See also
 Wesberry v. Sanders, : Earlier Georgia congressional redistricting case
 Wright v. Rockefeller, 
 Shaw v. Reno, 
 Bush v. Vera, 
 Hunt v. Cromartie, 
 Easley v. Cromartie, 
 Georgia v. Ashcroft, :  Georgia State Senate redistricting case
 League of United Latin American Citizens v. Perry, 
 Alabama Legislative Black Caucus v. Alabama, 
 List of United States Supreme Court cases, volume 515
Briffault, Richard "Race and Representation after Miller v. Johnson" University of Chicago Legal Forum, vol. 1995, issue 1, article 3

References

External links

Further reading

United States equal protection case law
United States Supreme Court cases
United States electoral redistricting case law
1995 in United States case law
American Civil Liberties Union litigation
Gerrymandering in the United States
Congressional districts of Georgia (U.S. state)
United States Supreme Court cases of the Rehnquist Court